The Living End is the eighteenth album by outsider musician Jandek and the only release of (1989). Corwood Industries #0756 continues the bluesy band sound of the prior two albums, but adds a new, thinner-voiced female vocalist to the mix.

Track listing

External links 
Seth Tisue's The Living End review

Jandek albums
1989 albums
Corwood Industries albums